Dragon's blood is a bright red resin which is obtained from different species of a number of distinct plant genera: Calamus spp. (previously Daemonorops) also including Calamus rotang, Croton, Dracaena and Pterocarpus. The red resin has been in continuous use since ancient times as varnish, medicine, incense,  and dye.

Name and source 

A great  degree of confusion existed for the ancients in regard to the source and identity of dragon's blood. Some medieval encyclopedias claimed its source as the literal blood of elephants and dragons who had perished in mortal combat. The resin of Dracaena species, "true" dragon's blood, and the very poisonous mineral cinnabar (mercury sulfide) were often confused by the ancient Romans. In ancient China, little or no distinction was made among the types of dragon's blood from the different species. Both Dracaena and Calamus resins are still often marketed today as dragon's blood, with little or no distinction being made between the plant sources; however, the resin obtained from Calamus has become the most commonly sold type in modern times, often in the form of large balls of resin.

Voyagers to the Canary Islands in the 15th century obtained dragon's blood as dried garnet-red drops from Dracaena draco, a tree native to the Canary Islands and Morocco. The resin is exuded from its wounded trunk or branches. Dragon's blood is also obtained by the same method from the closely related Dracaena cinnabari, which is endemic to the island of Socotra. This resin was traded to ancient Europe via the Incense Road.

Dragon's blood resin is also produced from the rattan palms of the genus Calamus of the Indonesian islands and known there as jernang or djernang. It is gathered by breaking off the layer of red resin encasing the unripe fruit of the rattan. The collected resin is then rolled into solid balls before being sold.

The red latex of the Sangre de Drago (called Sangre de Grado in Peru), from any of seven species of Croton native to Peru, Ecuador and Brazil, has purported wound-healing and antioxidant properties, and has been used for centuries by native people.

Uses 
The dragon's blood known to the ancient Romans was mostly collected from D. cinnabari, and is mentioned in the 1st century Periplus (30: 10. 17) as one of the products of Socotra. Socotra had been an important trading centre since at least the time of the Ptolemies. Dragon's blood was used as a dye, painting pigment, and medicine (respiratory and gastrointestinal problems) in the Mediterranean basin, and was held by early Greeks, Romans, and Arabs to have medicinal properties. Dioscorides and other early Greek writers described its medicinal uses.

Locals on Socotra island use the Dracaena resin as a sort of cure-all, using it for such things as general wound healing, a coagulant (though this is ill-advised with commercial products, as the Calamus species acts as an anti-coagulant and it is usually unknown what species the dragon's blood came from), curing diarrhea, lowering fevers, dysentery diseases, taken internally for ulcers in the mouth, throat, intestines and stomach, as well as an antiviral for respiratory viruses, stomach viruses and for skin disorders such as eczema. It was also used in medieval ritual magic and alchemy.

Dragon's blood of both Dracaena draco (commonly referred to as the Draconis Palm) and Dracaena cinnabari were used as a source of varnish for 18th century Italian violinmakers. There was also an 18th-century recipe for toothpaste that contained dragon's blood. In modern times it is still used as a varnish for violins, in photoengraving, as an incense resin, and as a body oil.

Dragon's blood from both Calamus were used for ceremonies in India. Sometimes Dracaena resin, but more often Calamus resin, was used in China as red varnish for wooden furniture. It was also used to colour the surface of writing paper for banners and posters, used especially for weddings and for Chinese New Year.

In American Hoodoo, African-American folk magic, and New Orleans voodoo, it is used in mojo hands for money-drawing or love-drawing, and is used as incense to cleanse a space of negative entities or influences. It is also added to red ink to make "Dragon's Blood Ink", which is used to inscribe magical seals and talismans.

In folk medicine, dragon's blood is used externally as a wash to promote healing of wounds and to stop bleeding. It is used internally for chest pains, post-partum bleeding, internal traumas and menstrual irregularities.

In neopagan Witchcraft, it is used to increase the potency of spells for protection, love, banishing and sexuality. In New Age shamanism it is used in ceremonies in a similar way as the neopagans use it.

Dragon's blood incense is also occasionally sold as "red rock opium" to unsuspecting would-be drug buyers. It actually contains no opiates, and has only slight psychoactive effects, if any at all.

Thaspine from the Dragon's Blood of the species Croton lechleri has possible use as a cancer drug.

Safety 
A study on oral toxicity of the DC resin methanol extract taken from the perennial tree Dracaena cinnabari was performed on female Sprague Dawley rats in February 2018. Acute and sub-acute oral toxicity tests found that the extract could be tolerated up to 2,000 mg/kg body weight.

See also
 Crofelemer, South American tree  (Croton lechleri), unrelated to Dracaena and rattan palm (the generus Calamus)

List of botanical sources
 Calamus rotang L.
 Calamus draco Willd. (synonyms include Daemonorops draco, D. rubra)
 Calamus didymophyllus Becc. Ridl. (synonyms include Daemonorops motleyi, D. didymophylla)
 Croton draconoides Müll. Arg.
 Croton draco Schltdl. & Cham.
 Croton lechleri Müll. Arg.
 Croton erythrochilus Müll. Arg.
 Croton palanostigma Klotzsch
 Croton perspeciosus Croizat
 Croton rimbachii Croizat
 Croton sampatik Müll. Arg.
 Croton urucurana Baill.
 Croton xalapensis Kunth
 Dracaena cinnabari Balf.f.
 Dracaena cochinchinensis hort. ex Baker
 Dracaena draco (L.) L.
 Pterocarpus officinalis Jacq.

Footnotes

References 
 Casson, L. 1989. The Periplus Maris Erythraei. Princeton University Press. Especially, pp. 69, 168-170. .
 Hill, John E. 2004. The Peoples of the West. A draft annotated translation from the 3rd century Weilüe. Note 12.12 (13).
 
 Meza, E. N. (Editor). 1999. Desarrollando nuestra diversidad biocultural: Sangre de Grado y el reto de su producción sustentable en el Perú. Lima: Universidad Nacional Mayor de San Marcos, Fondo Editorial.
 Schafer, E. H. 1963. The Golden Peaches of Samarkand: A study of T'ang Exotics. University of California Press. First paperback edition, 1985., p. 211. ISBN
 Schoff, Wilfred H. 1912. The Periplus of the Erythraean Sea. Longmans, Green, and Co., New York, Second Edition. Reprint: New Delhi, Oriental Books Reprint Corporation. 1974. (A new hardback edition is available from Coronet Books Inc. Also reprinted by South Asia Books, 1995)

Incense material
Biological pigments
Organic pigments
Resins
Magic substances
Traditional medicine